Breach of Promise is a 1932 American pre-Code drama film directed by Paul L. Stein and starring Chester Morris, Mae Clarke and Mary Doran.

Cast
Chester Morris as James Pomeroy  
Mae Clarke as Hattie Pugmire 
Mary Doran as Mille Applegate  
Theodore von Eltz as District Attorney  
Elizabeth Patterson as Cora Pugmire  
Charles Middleton as Joe Pugmire  
Lucille La Verne as Mrs. Flynn  
Eddie Borden as Hotel Clerk  
Edward LeSaint as Judge  
Alan Roscoe as Committeeman  
Harriet Lorraine as Committeewoman  
Philo McCullough as Committeeman  
Tom Mcguire as Committeeman

References

External links

1932 drama films
American black-and-white films
American drama films
Films directed by Paul L. Stein
Tiffany Pictures films
1930s American films